Please Send Me Someone to Love is an album by American jazz pianist Phineas Newborn Jr. recorded in 1969 and released on the Contemporary label. The album was recorded at the same sessions that produced Harlem Blues.

Reception
The Allmusic review by Scott Yanow states "The emphasis generally is on vintage tunes, and Newborn shows throughout that he was still very much in his musical prime".

Track listing
 "Please Send Me Someone to Love" (Percy Mayfield) – 5:05
 "Rough Ridin'" (Ella Fitzgerald, Hank Jones, Bill Tennyson) – 4:09
 "Come Sunday" (Duke Ellington) – 4:52
 "Brentwood Blues" (Phineas Newborn Jr.) – 8:01
 "He's a Real Gone Guy" (Nellie Lutcher) – 4:39
 "Black Coffee" (Sonny Burke, Paul Francis Webster) – 7:03
 "Little Niles" (Randy Weston) – 4:20
 "Stay on It" (Count Basie, Tadd Dameron) – 5:05

Personnel
Phineas Newborn Jr. – piano
Ray Brown – bass
Elvin Jones – drums

References

Contemporary Records albums
Phineas Newborn Jr. albums
1969 albums